The Beer Factor is an Australian late-night talk show television series aired on GO! on 1 September 2012. It is hosted by Tom Gleeson.

References

9Go! original programming
Australian comedy television series
2012 Australian television series debuts
2012 Australian television series endings